Kevin Dotson (born September 18, 1996) is an American football offensive guard for the Pittsburgh Steelers of the National Football League (NFL). He played college football at Louisiana.

Early life and high school
Dotson was born in West Point, Mississippi and grew up in Plaquemine, Louisiana. He attended Plaquemine High School, where he played football with his twin brother Kenny.

College career
Dotson redshirted his true freshman season. He became the Ragin' Cajuns right guard two weeks into his redshirt freshman and was named to the Sun Belt Conference All-Newcomer Team. Dotson was named second-team All-Sun Belt as a redshirt sophomore after starting all 12 of Louisiana's games. He was named first-team All-Sun Belt as a redshirt junior after starting 14 games at right guard. Dotson started all 14 of the Ragin' Cajuns games and was again named first-team All-Sun Belt as a redshirt senior and was also named a first-team All-American by the Associated Press and to the second-team by the Sporting News.

Professional career

Dotson was selected in the fourth round of the 2020 NFL draft, 135th overall, by the Pittsburgh Steelers. He made his NFL debut on September 14, 2020, in the season opener against the New York Giants, entering the game at right guard to replace injured starter Stefen Wisniewski. Dotson made his first career start the following week on September 20, 2020, against the Denver Broncos. He was placed on the reserve/COVID-19 list by the team on November 14, 2020, and activated on November 30.

Dotson entered the 2021 season as the Steelers starting left guard. He started the first nine games before suffering an ankle injury in Week 10. He was placed on injured reserve on November 20, 2021.

References

External links 
 Louisiana Ragin' Cajuns bio

Living people
American football offensive guards
Players of American football from Louisiana
Louisiana Ragin' Cajuns football players
People from Plaquemine, Louisiana
People from West Point, Mississippi
Pittsburgh Steelers players
1996 births
All-American college football players